The Blocker House is a historic plantation house located near Edgefield, Edgefield County, South Carolina built circa 1790 by John Blocker, Sr. It is a two-story, clapboard dwelling with a one-story shed-roofed porch supported by four square columns. The property includes centuries old magnolia and cedar trees, a family cemetery, and several outbuildings.

It was listed on the National Register of Historic Places in 1971.

References

Plantation houses in South Carolina
Houses on the National Register of Historic Places in South Carolina
Houses completed in 1775
Houses in Edgefield County, South Carolina
National Register of Historic Places in Edgefield County, South Carolina